A line of communication (or communications) is the route that connects an operating military unit with its supply base. Supplies and reinforcements are transported along the line of communication. Therefore, a secure and open line of communication is vital for any military force to continue to operate effectively. Prior to the advent of the use of the telegraph and radio in warfare, lines of communication were also the routes used by dispatch riders on horseback and runners to convey and deliver orders and battle updates to and from unit commanders and headquarters. Thus, a unit whose lines of communication were compromised was vulnerable to becoming isolated and destroyed, as the means for requesting reinforcements and resupply is lost. The standard military abbreviation is LOC. There is also SLOC for Sea Line of Communication, GLOC for Ground Line of Communication, or ALOC for Air Line of Communication.

The interdiction of supplies and reinforcements to units closer to the front lines is therefore an important strategic goal for opposing forces. Some notable examples:
 The siege of Vicksburg in the American Civil War, in which Ulysses S. Grant encircled the city, leading to its eventual surrender in July 1863
 The Battle of France in World War II, in which the Germans cut off the French and British armies in Belgium (although the Dunkirk evacuation rescued over 330,000 of them)
 The encirclement of German 6th Army in the Battle of Stalingrad in World War II
 United States attacks on the Ho Chi Minh trail during the Vietnam War

See also

Logistics in general 
Aerial refueling
Airlift
Army engineering maintenance
Expeditionary maneuver warfare
Integrated logistics support
Logistician
Logistics Officer
Main supply route
Military logistics
Military supply chain management
NATO Stock Number
Performance-based logistics
Seabasing
Sealift
Train (military)
Underway replenishment

Specific logistics operations 
Battle of Pusan Perimeter logistics
British logistics in the Falklands War
British logistics in the Second Boer War

Notes

A line of communication can also refer to a civilian management (corporations lines of communication)

References
The Oxford Essential Dictionary of the U.S. Military. Copyright © 2001, 2002 by Oxford University Press

Military strategy